Donald W. Banner (February 23, 1924 – January 29, 2006) was a United States Commissioner of Patents and Trademarks.

Early life and career
Banner was born in Chicago and served as a P-47 pilot during World War II. He was shot down over Italy, and held in a German POW camp until April 29, 1945.

After the war, Banner attended Purdue University, graduating with a BSEE in 1948. He earned his Juris Doctor in 1952 from the University of Detroit. He later went on to earn his Master of Patent Law in 1958, and his Doctor of Laws in 1979 from the John Marshall Law School.

Political career
Banner was appointed to be U.S. Commissioner of Patents and Trademarks by both Presidents Nixon and Carter, the only person to be so appointed by presidents of both political parties. He served in that office only during the Carter Administration from 1978 to 1979. After his time as Commissioner of Patents he entered private practice with the firm now known as Banner & Witcoff. He also served as director of the Patent Law Division at John Marshall Law School.

He died on January 29, 2006, in Tucson, Arizona.

References

	

1924 births
2006 deaths
United States Army Air Forces pilots of World War II
United States Army Air Forces officers
University of Detroit Mercy alumni
Purdue University College of Engineering alumni
American prisoners of war in World War II
Lawyers who have represented the United States government
World War II prisoners of war held by Germany
United States Commissioners of Patents
John Marshall Law School (Chicago) alumni